Makemake is a large planetoid in the Kuiper belt.

Makemake may also refer to:
Makemake (deity), the creator of humanity in the mythology of Easter Island
 a make-makefile tool in build automation
"Make Make", a song by Mike Oldfield from Heaven's Open
Make-Make, an album by Jabberwocky
The Makemakes, an Austrian pop-rock band

fr:Makemake